Kamran Afshar Naderi (born 1959) is an Iranian architect, architectural critic, painter and artist.

Biography 
Kamran Afshar Naderi was born in 1959 in Mashhad, Iran. He started his studies in architecture in 1977 at the University of Tehran. In 1980, he moved to Italy and resumed his studies at the University of Genoa, where he graduated in the field of architecture. His thesis concerned the methodologies of design in the ancient Iran.

His professional career started in 1986 in Italy, and he established his own office in Tehran in 1993. Since 1993, he has taught at Islamic Azad University and Soureh Universities of Tehran (non-continuously).

External links
 Official website

1959 births
Iranian architects
Iranian art critics
People from Mashhad
University of Tehran alumni
University of Genoa alumni
Living people